Ceephax Acid Crew is the name of two 12" vinyl EPs and a double-CD album of music by Ceephax Acid Crew. All tracks except "Milk Tray" from Part 1 and "Acid Vaccination" from Part Two were released on the double-CD. Additional songs on the double-CD are from Radiotin EP, Bainted Smile EP and Acid Legacy EP.

Track listing

Part 1, 12" vinyl
Side A
"Acid Le Soken"
"Camelot Pollution"
"Culteddy"
Side B
"The Snake Block (Ice Rink Emotions)"
"Milk Tray"
"Play Your Cards Right"

Part 2, 12" vinyl
Side A
"Fantastic Planet"
"Friday Film Special Acid"
"Acid Faust"
Side B
"Acid Vaccination"
"Swab Funk"
"Credick"

2xCD
CD 1
"Camelot Pollution" - 2:38 (from Ceephax Acid Crew Part 1)
"Swab Funk" - 6:01 (from Ceephax Acid Crew Part 2)
"The Snake Block (Ice Rink Emotions)" - 7:19 (from Ceephax Acid Crew Part 1)
"Acid Faust" - 1:53 (from Ceephax Acid Crew Part 2)
"Marshmellow" - 3:14 (from Acid Legacy EP)
"Acid Le Soken" - 8:31 (from Ceephax Acid Crew Part 1)
"Play Your Cards Right" - 2:13 (from Ceephax Acid Crew Part 1)
"Culteddy" - 3:21 (from Ceephax Acid Crew Part 1)
"Friday Film Special Acid" - 4:22 (from Ceephax Acid Crew Part 2)
"Fantastic Planet" - 7:05 (from Ceephax Acid Crew Part 2)
"Credick" - 4:05 (from Ceephax Acid Crew Part 2)
CD 2
"Ceephax Acid" - 5:53 (from Bainted Smile EP)
"Ghost Train Acid (Long Version)" - 3:16 (from Bainted Smile EP) (the Bainted Smile version doesn't say Long Version and is 2:40)
"Acid On Sea" - 4:10 (from Radiotin EP)
"Arterial Acid Part I" - 2:39 (from Radiotin EP)
"Arterial Acid Part II" - 2:22 (from Radiotin EP)
"Theme For Radiotin" - 0:42 (from Radiotin EP)
"Arterial Acid Part III" - 2:23 (from Radiotin EP)
"Arterial Acid Part IV" - 2:20 (from Bainted Smile EP)
"Vax Alley" - 2:26 (from Bainted Smile EP)
"Space Paranoia (Long Version)" - 4:17 (from Radiotin EP) (the Radiotin version doesn't say Long Version and is 3:56)
"Dennis Weaver Acid" - 5:06 (from Bainted Smile EP)
"Static (Long Version)" - 4:19 (from Bainted Smile EP) (the Bainted Smile version doesn't say Long Version and is 3:09)
"3 Note Safari" - 2:26 (from Radiotin EP)
"Flogan's Code (Part II)"/"Ending" - 10:16 (10:06 and 0:10 respectively) (both from Radiotin EP)

References
Discogs entry: CD , Part 1 , Part 2 

2003 compilation albums
Ceephax Acid Crew albums